Hélène Karbanov (born 29 December 2004) is a French individual rhythmic gymnast of Russian origin. She is the French National all-around bronze medalist in 2022, and has placed 13th in the all-around at the 2022 European Championships in Tel Aviv.

Career 

Karbanov first competed in the sport in 2013 with her club Calais GRS. In her first junior season, she won the silver medal in the all-around behind Valérie Romenski, even though still having Russian citizenship.
In January 2018, she obtained the French citizenship. Being able to compete internationally for France, she was selected to represent her country at the 2018 European Championships in Guadalajara. She finished 8th in the team competition, 29th with ball and 30th with clubs.

In 2019 she became the French junior all around champion, and won as well silver with ball and bronze with ribbon. Thus, she was selected to compete at the 2019 Junior World Rhythmic Gymnastics Championships in Moscow, Russia. She participated with clubs and ribbon, where she respectively finished in 9th and 11th place. She and Polina Murashko from Estonia had the same clubs score, but the Estonian gymnast was able to enter the final with her better execution score.

Routine music information

References

2004 births
Living people
French rhythmic gymnasts
21st-century French women